The Tonkin Asian frog (Quasipaa delacouri) is a species of frog in the family Dicroglossidae. Based on its known distribution, it is endemic to northern Vietnam, although it is considered likely that it also occurs in adjacent Laos and China.
This poorly known species is presumed to be associated with small streams (its habitat in the Tam Đảo National Park). Possible threats include collection for human consumption and habitat loss.

References

delacouri
Amphibians of Vietnam
Endemic fauna of Vietnam
Taxa named by Fernand Angel
Amphibians described in 1928
Taxonomy articles created by Polbot